The 2017 Liga 3 Bali was the second edition of Liga 3 (formerly known as Liga Nusantara) Bali as a qualifying round for the national round of 2017 Liga 3. Pro Kundalini, winner of the 2014 Liga Nusantara Bali were the defending champions, as the 2015 Liga Nusantara Bali was not held and the 2016 ISC Liga Nusantara Bali was not counted as an official competition. The competition began on 9 July 2017 and concluded on 6 August 2017.

Persekaba Bali won their first Liga 3 Bali title following a penalty 4–3 won over Perseden Denpasar after 1–1 draw until extra time on 6 August 2017. Persekaba Bali would represent Bali Region in national round of 2017 Liga 3.

Format
In this competition, the teams were divided into two groups of five. The two best teams were through to knockout stage. The winner would represent Bali Region in national round of 2017 Liga 3.

Teams
There are 10 clubs participated this season.

Group stage
This stage scheduled started on 9 July 2017 and finished 27 July 2017.

Group A
 All matches played in Yoga Perkanthi Stadium, Jimbaran
 Times listed were local (UTC+8:00)

Group B
 All matches played in Kompyang Sujana Stadium, Denpasar
 Times listed were local (UTC+8:00)

Knockout stage

Semifinals

Third place

Final

Statistics

Top scorers

Source:Group stage, Knockout stage

References 

2017 in Indonesian football
Sport in Bali